Cradle of Rome (released in some regions as Jewel Master: Cradle of Rome) is the first in a series of  tile-matching puzzle and strategy video games developed by German studio cerasus.media and published by D3 Publisher on November 18, 2008 for the Nintendo DS handheld game console. The Wii version was released on March 31, 2009. The game has been brought to Steam since 2007.

The game was originally created for Windows by Awem studio from Belarus as a casual game. It has been followed by a variety of Cradle/Jewel Master games including Cradle of Athena, Cradle of Egypt and Cradle of Persia.

Gameplay

The gameplay is similar to that of Bejeweled; the player must flip jewels/resources on a playing field to create matches of at least three items of the same type. As matches are formed, reserves of resources such as grain and wood are built up, which are used towards building the Roman Empire. Between rounds, resources can be spent on farms, taverns and other buildings to cultivate the commonwealth. The goal of each round is to form matches on blue tiles to clear them from the screen. Obstacles increase the game's difficulty; they include locked gems/resources, which cannot be switched until a match is made to unlock them. Each round also has a time limit, which is represented by a slowly emptying vase of water on the top screen. To help the player, several power-ups can be acquired, such as a hammer that can destroy any tile on the field. The game progresses with new types of gems and resources being unlocked at every new building built in Rome. Some buildings provide an extra bonus citizen with in-game bonuses if the player plays skillfully with the particular resource unlocked from that building.

Reception
Cradle of Rome was given a mixed reception by video game critics, and it received an aggregated score of 63% at Metacritic. IGN was disappointed with the game, noting that the game's manual did not adequately explain how the game worked. They also found that its electronic soundtrack did not fit the game's Roman theme. Their review gave the game a score of 5.9 of 10 and suggested that players purchase better alternatives such as The Quest Trio, stating, "It's another match-three game. There's nothing wrong with it, but it's been done better before." Game Informer gave it a 6.75 with the subheading "MORE LIKE CRADLE OF BORING" in Game Informer Issue 189 January 2009.

Rome Puzzle
Cradle of Rome was originally developed from an Awem Studios game by the name Rome Puzzle. This game was intended to be a casual game and many websites hosted and are currently the game as 'play online for free' - Rome Puzzle version. The Rome Puzzle version was developed and revamped before being published as Cradle of Rome by D3.

References

External links
 Cradle of Rome at IGN

Browser games
Puzzle video games
Strategy video games
2008 video games
Nintendo DS games
Wii games
Video games developed in Belarus
Video games developed in Germany
Video games set in the Roman Empire
D3 Publisher games
Single-player video games